The Beat is the debut album by American power pop band The Beat, released in 1979 on Columbia Records.

The liner notes give special thanks to the following people: "Eddie Money (without you we wouldn't be here now) and Jerry Pompili, all the people at CBS & B.G.P., Don Ellis, Ken Sasano, The Masque, all the boys at the Parking Lot, David Gales, Bill Graham and Marcy."

Track listing 
All songs written by Paul Collins, except where noted.

 "Rock n Roll Girl" – 2:16
 "I Don't Fit In" – 2:46
 "Different Kind of Girl" (Collins, Steven Huff) – 3:23
 "Don't Wait Up for Me" – 3:02
 "You Won't Be Happy" – 2:20
 "Walking Out on Love" – 1:44
 "Work-a-Day World" – 3:05
 "U.S.A." (Collins, Peter Case) – 2:12
 "Let Me into Your Life" (Collins, Eddie Money) – 2:35
 "Working Too Hard" – 1:57
 "You and I" – 2:47
 "Look but Don't Touch" – 3:09

Personnel 
Credits adapted from liner notes.

The Beat
Paul Collins – rhythm guitar, lead vocals
Steven Huff – bass, second vocals
Larry Whitman – lead guitar, third vocals 
Michael Ruiz – drums, percussion

Additional personnel
Bruce Botnick – production
Rik "Aloha" Pekkonen – engineering
Rodney Lovett – assistant engineering
Dave Costel – assistant engineering
Bernie Grundman – mastering at A&M Studios

References

External links 

1979 debut albums
Columbia Records albums
The Beat (American band) albums
Albums produced by Bruce Botnick
Albums recorded at United Western Recorders